Megali Volvi is a village of the Volvi municipality. Before the 2011 local government reform it was part of the municipality of Rentina. The 2011 census recorded 123 inhabitants in the village. Megali Volvi is a part of the community of Volvi.

See also
 List of settlements in the Thessaloniki regional unit

References

Populated places in Thessaloniki (regional unit)